The 2021 Penn Quakers football team represented the University of Pennsylvania in the 2021 NCAA Division I FCS football season as a member of the Ivy League. The team  was led by sixth-year head coach Ray Priore and played its home games at Franklin Field. Penn averaged 4,971 fans per game.

Schedule

References

Penn
Penn Quakers football seasons
Penn Quakers football